Events in 2019 in anime. The first year of the Reiwa era.

Releases

Films
A list of anime that debuted in theaters between January 1 and December 31, 2019.

Television series
A list of anime television series that debuted between January 1 and December 31, 2019.

Original net animations
A list of original net animations that debuted between January 1 and December 31, 2019.

Original video animations
A list of original video animations that debuted between January 1 and December 31, 2019.

Deaths

January 6: , 78, Japanese voice actor
January 25: Maeghan Albach, 44, American voice actress
February 1: Kinryū Arimoto, 78, Japanese voice actor
February 26: Yasuta Sato, 94, founder of Takara Tomy, collaborating to BeyBlade, Pretty Rhythm, Ryukendo and others,
March 26: Fuyumi Shiraishi, 82, Japanese voice actor, radio announcer
April 5: Wowaka, 31, Japanese musician; performed "Polaris", one of ending themes from anime series Boruto: Naruto Next Generations.
April 11: Monkey Punch, 81, creator of Lupin III
April 16: Kiyoshi Kawakubo, 89, Japanese voice actor
June 10: Yuzuru Fujimoto, 83, Japanese voice actor
July 18: Notable people killed in the Kyoto Animation arson attack
Naomi Ishida, 49, Japanese colorist
Yoshiji Kigami, 61, Japanese animator, director, and storyboarder
Futoshi Nishiya, 37, Japanese animator, director, and character designer
Yasuhiro Takemoto, 47, Japanese director
July 28: Yuu Shimaka, 70, Japanese voice actor
August 3: , 86, Japanese animator
August 31: Michael Lindsay, 56, American voice actor

See also
2019 in Japanese television
2019 Japanese imperial transition
2019 in British television
2019 in television
2019 in animation

Notes

References

External links 
Japanese animated works of the year, listed in the IMDb

Years in anime
anime
anime